Roger Heywood (4 May 1909 – 1985) was an English footballer who played in the Football League for Leicester City.

References

1909 births
1985 deaths
English footballers
Leicester City F.C. players
English Football League players
Association football defenders